Niña Bonita is the second album by the Mexican singer Patricia Manterola.

Track listing

References

1996 albums
Patricia Manterola albums